Hrvatska riječ (lit. The Croatian Word) is a Croatian language weekly newspaper in Serbia. It is currently published in Subotica.

History 

It was founded in 1945, with the purpose to serve as the information organ for the Croatian minority of Serbia. It was published like this until 1956, but was no longer printed until 2003, when the newspaper was re-launched.

See also 
 Croats of Serbia
 Croat National Council

External links
 

Croats of Vojvodina
Croatian-language newspapers
Newspapers published in Serbia
Newspapers published in Yugoslavia
Newspapers established in 1945
Culture of Vojvodina
Mass media in Subotica
1945 establishments in Serbia